Opheodrys is a genus of small to medium-sized nonvenomous colubrid snakes commonly referred to as green snakes. In North America the genus consists of two distinct species. As their common names imply, the rough green snake has keeled dorsal scales, whereas the smooth green snake has smooth dorsal scales.

Species

Valid species
The following two species are recognized as being valid.
Opheodrys aestivus (Linnaeus, 1766) – rough green snake
Opheodrys vernalis (Harlan, 1827) – smooth green snake

Nota bene: A binomial authority in parentheses indicates that the species was originally described in a genus other than Opheodrys.

Species removed from the genus
The genus Opheodrys at one time included two Asian species: O. herminae, which is endemic to Japan, and O. major, which is endemic to Central/South China, Taiwan, N. Vietnam, and Laos.  These were removed from the genus by Cundall in 1981

Opheodrys herminae (Boettger, 1895) = Cyclophiops herminae (Boettger, 1895) – Sakashima green snake
Opheodrys major (Günther, 1858) = Cyclophiops major (Günther, 1858) – greater green snake

Subspecies no longer recognized
The following subspecies of Opheodrys are no longer recognized by ITIS: 
Opheodrys aestivus aestivus (Linnaeus, 1766) – northern rough green snake
Opheodrys aestivus carinatus Grobman, 1984 – Florida rough green snake
Opheodrys vernalis blanchardi Grobman, 1941 – western smooth green snake
Opheodrys vernalis borealis Grobman, 1992 – northern smooth green snake
Opheodrys vernalis vernalis (Harlan, 1827) – eastern smooth green snake.

Geographic range
Green snakes of the genus Opheodrys are found in the United States, southern Canada, and northern Mexico.

Description
Green snakes are so named because they are typically solid green in color dorsally, with a cream-colored or yellow underside. They are thin-bodied snakes that rarely exceed 90 cm (around 36 inches) in length. They have large eyes and blunt shaped heads.

Habitat
Green snakes are often found in dense, low lying vegetation near a permanent water source.

Behavior
Green snakes have been known to follow human activity. They rely on their color for camouflage and will usually attempt to escape if threatened.

Diet
Their primary diet is soft-bodied arthropods, including crickets, spiders, moths, butterflies, and grasshoppers.

Reproduction
Green snakes of the genus Opheodrys are oviparous.

References

Further reading
Fitzinger L (1843). Systema Reptilium, Fasciculus Primus, Amblyglossae. Vienna: Braumüller & Seidel. 106 pp. + indices. (Opheodrys, new genus, p. 26). (in Latin).

External links

Smooth Green Snake - Opheodrys vernalis Species account from the Iowa Reptile and Amphibian Field Guide
Georgia Department of Natural Resources -- Laws Related to Native Wildlife

 
Colubrids
Snakes of North America
Snake genera
Taxa named by Leopold Fitzinger